V. K. Narayana Menon (Thrissur Vadakke Kurupath Narayana Menon) (1911–1997) was a scholar of classical Indian dance and Indian classical music. He was one of the prominent art critics of India and a Sangeet Natak Akademi Fellowship.

Education and career
Menon was born in Thrissur city of Kerala, in the famous Vadakke Kurupath family. He started his career as BBC Music program producer. Later he became the Director General of the same. He had held important positions in art institutions and broadcasting centres of India. He was deputy director of All India Radio. He was the secretary of Sangeet Natak Akademi, New Delhi- supreme centre for art, music and dance of Government of India. He was the President of National Centre for the Performing Arts- Bombay etc. During these tenures he promoted various arts and artists immensely.

He was noted for his writings about Classical Indian dance and music. He has written many articles and books on the subject. He was considered one of the finest Indian art critic. Kerala: A profile, Balasaraswati (About the life of great Bharatanatyam dancer Balasaraswati), The Communication Revolution, The Language of Music, Development of William Butler Yeats are some of his works. He used to write columns regularly in esteemed magazines like Illustrated Weekly of India and newspapers.

Indian government honoured him by the Padma Bhushan in 1969 and the Sangeet Natak Akademi Fellowship in 1980.

He was married to the daughter of Rabindranath Tagore's brother.

See also
Mani Madhava Chakyar

Notes

External links
more about The Language of Music
Balasaraswati, Inter-National Culture Center, 16 Hailey Road, New Delhi 1, INDIA
V. K. Narayana Menon Interview on India Today

1911 births
Indian musicologists
Musicians from Kerala
Recipients of the Sangeet Natak Akademi Fellowship
Year of death missing
Dance writers
Indian columnists
Recipients of the Padma Bhushan in arts
All India Radio people
Writers from Kerala
Indian art critics
Indian male writers
Indian music educators
20th-century Indian educators
20th-century Indian non-fiction writers
Scholars from Kerala
Recipients of the Sahitya Akademi Prize for Translation